Lotus Mark IV was a trials car by Colin Chapman built on an Austin 7 chassis. Chapman's success at building trials cars brought another previous customer, Mike Lawson, to order a second trials car in 1952 to replace his Lotus Mark II, in which he won the Wrotham Cup. Once again Chapman chose an Austin Seven as the starting point, reinforcing the frame and installing a four-cylinder , Ford, sidevalve engine. Chapman used all the tricks he had learned in his previous cars, constructing a lightweight aluminum body with a rounded nosecone. He fitted a 3-speed transmission taken from a Ford 8 and the divided front axle as on his previous cars.  

Lawson won his class in the first attempt in this car, following up with others, solidifying Chapman's reputation as a designer and engineer. The success of this car, and other requests for more cars, led Chapman and Michael Allen to establish Lotus Engineering in a disused stable in Hornsey.

Ford Sidevalve Motor
Configuration: S4 SV
Displacement: 1172 cc
Bore/Stroke: 63.5mm x 92.456mm (2.5x3.64")

References  

 Taylor, William, The Lotus Book:The Complete History of Lotus Cars Coterie Press Limited, 1998.
 Tipler, John,  Lotus and Caterham Seven: Racers for the Road  The Crowood Press, 1995.
 Coulter, Jeremy, The Lotus & Caterham Seven: A Collector's Guide   Motor Racing Publications, 1986.
 Setright, L.J.K, "Lotus: The golden mean", in Northey, Tom, ed. World of Automobiles (London: Orbis, 1974), Volume 11, p. 1221-34.

External links 
 Motorbase Accessed 17 February 2006.

Mark 04